David Hugh McKee (born 1 May 1919 in Wondai, Queensland, Australia - died 4 May 2005 in Adelaide, South Australia) was an Australian politician who represented the South Australian House of Assembly seats of  Port Pirie (1959-1970) and Pirie (1970-1975) for the Labor Party. He was Minister of Labour and Industry from 1970 to 1975 under Don Dunstan.
David was one of the most progressive politicians of his time making significant contributions towards "South Australia’s pioneering legalisation of abortion and male homosexual acts in 1969 and 1972."
Upon his passing, Members of Parliament from both the Labor and Liberal parties recalled his strength of character and some of the legendary tales of Dave's time as the Member for Pirie.
David was husband to Rhonda, father to Colin  and Laneene, grandfather to Penelope and Matthew and great grandfather to Tabitha, Mitchell and Marley. Dave and Rhonda played a hugely important role in raising their grandchildren after his resignation in 1975, the year his granddaughter was born.

References

 

Members of the South Australian House of Assembly
Australian Labor Party members of the Parliament of South Australia
2005 deaths
1919 births